Coralie Frasse Sombet (born 8 April 1991 in Saint-Martin-d'Hères) is a French alpine ski racer.

References

1991 births
Living people
French female alpine skiers
Place of birth missing (living people)
Alpine skiers at the 2022 Winter Olympics
Olympic alpine skiers of France
People from Saint-Martin-d'Hères
Sportspeople from Isère